, ,  or  : 1573 – September 15, 1626) was a prominently-placed female figure in the Azuchi–Momoyama period and early Edo period. She was a daughter of Oichi and the sister of Yodo-dono and Ohatsu. When she rose to higher political status during the Tokugawa shogunate, she took the title of "Ōmidaidokoro". Following the fall of the Council of Five Elders, Oeyo and her sisters were key figures in maintaining a diplomatic relationship between the two most powerful clans of their time, Toyotomi and Tokugawa. Due to her great contributions to politics at the beginning of the Edo period she was posthumously inducted into the Junior First Rank of the Imperial Court, the second highest honor that could be conferred by the Emperor of Japan.

Oeyo married three times, first to Saji Kazunari, her cousin, then to Toyotomi Hideyoshi's nephew, Toyotomi Hidekatsu. She had a daughter with Hidekatsu named Toyotomi Sadako later married Kujō Yukiie.  Her third and last husband Tokugawa Hidetada became the second Tokugawa shōgun. She was also the mother of his successor Iemitsu, the third shōgun.  She had Senhime, Tamahime, Katsuhime, Hatsuhime, Takechiyo (Iemitsu), and Tadanaga. Hatsuhime was adopted by Oeyo's sister Ohatsu, who is the wife of Kyōgoku Takatsugu.

Surviving record books from merchants of luxury goods provide insight into patterns of patronage and taste amongst the privileged class of women like Oeyo and her sisters.

Genealogy
Oeyo, also known as Ogō, was the third and youngest daughter of the Sengoku-period daimyō Azai Nagamasa. Her mother, Oichi was the younger sister of Oda Nobunaga.   Toyotomi Hideyoshi became the adoptive father and protector of Oeyo in the period before her marriage.

Oeyo's oldest sister, styled Yodo-dono, Cha-Cha in birth name, was a prominent concubine of Hideyoshi who gave birth to his heir, Toyotomi Hideyori.

Oeyo's middle sister, Ohatsu was the wife of Kyōgoku Takatsugu and the mother of Kyōgoku Tadataka.

Family
 Father: Azai Nagamasa (1545-1573)
 Mother: Oichi (1547-1583)
 Step-Father: Shibata Katsuie (1522-1583)
 Foster Father: Toyotomi Hideyoshi (1537-1598)
 Husbands:
 Saji Kazunari (m. 1583 div. 1584)
 Toyotomi Hidekatsu (m. 1591–1592)
 Tokugawa Hidetada (m. 1595)
 Children:

by Hidekatsu
 Toyotomi Sadako (1592–1658), adopted by Toyotomi Hideyoshi and Yodo-dono later married Kujō Yukiie and later adopted by Tokugawa Hidetada

by Hidetada
 Senhime (1597-1666)
 Tamahime (1599-1622)
 Katsuhime
 Hatsuhime
 Tokugawa Iemitsu (1604-1651)
 Tokugawa Tadanaga (1606-1634)
 Tokugawa Masako (1607-1678)

Timeline
1573: Born
1573: Azai Nagamasa and Manpukumaru committed suicide, Oichi and her daughters returned to Oda clan.
1579: Moved to Azuchi Castle from Ise-Ueno Castle
1582: Oda Nobunaga was betrayed
1582: Oichi married to Shibata Katsuie
1583: Shibata Katsuie and Oichi committed suicide
1583: Married Saji Kazunari
1584: Divorced with Saji Kazunari
1587: Ohatsu married Kyōgoku Takatsugu
1589: Yodo-dono gave birth to Toyotomi Tsurumatsu
1591: Yodo-dono's son, Toyotomi Tsurumatsu died
1591: Married with Toyotomi Hidekatsu and moved to Jurakudai
1592: Toyotomi Hidekatsu died
1592: Gave birth to Toyotomi Sadako
1593: Yodo-dono gave birth to Toyotomi Hideyori
1595: Toyotomi Hidetsugu committed suicide and Jurakudai was dismantled
1595: Married Tokugawa Hidetada.
1597: May 26: Gave birth to Sen-hime
1599: Aug. 1: Gave birth to Tama-hime (died 9 August 1622)
1601: June 12: Gave birth to Katsu-hime (died 20 March 1672)
1601: Tamahime married Maeda Toshitsune
1602: Aug. 25: Gave birth to Hatsu-hime (died 16 April 1630)
1603: Senhime married to Toyotomi Hideyori
1603: June 3: Toyotomi Sadako married Kujō Yukiie
1604: Aug. 12: Gave birth to Iemitsu
1605: Hidetada becomes shogun
1606: June 12: Gave birth to Tadanaga
1607: Nov. 23: Gave birth to Matsu-hime Tokugawa Masako
1607: Sadahime gave birth to Nijō Yasumichi
1607: Hatsu-hime married Kyōgoku Tadataka
1609: Sadahime gave birth to Kujō Michifusa
1611: Katsuhime married Matsudaira Tadanao
1613: Tamahime give birth to Kametsuru-hime
1615: Toyotomi Hideyori and his mother Yodo-dono committed suicide, Osaka Castle burned and Senhime returned to Tokugawa Family.
1615: Sadahime gave birth to Matsudono Michimoto
1615: Tamahime gave birth to Maeda Mitsutaka
1616: Tamahime gave birth to Eihime
1616: Senhime married to Honda Tadatoki
1616: Katsuhime gave birth to Matsudaira Mitsunaga
1617: Tamahime's daughter, Eihime died
1617: Tamahime gave birth to Maeda Toshitsugu
1617: Katsuhime gave birth to Kamehime
1618: Senhime gave birth to (Honda) Katsuhime
1618: Tamahime gave birth to Maeda Toshiharu
1618: (Tokugawa) Katsuhime gave birth to Tsuruhime
1619: Senhime gave birth to Kochiyo
1619: Tamahime gave birth to Mitsuhime
1620: Masako married Emperor Go-Mizunoo
1621: Senhime's son, Kochiyo died
1621: Tamahime gave birth to Tomihime
1622: Katsuhime divorced Matsudaira Tadanao and went back to Tokugawa clan with her children.
1622: Tamahime gave birth to Natsuhime and died during childbirth
1623: daughter of Tamahime, Natsuhime died
1623: Iemitsu becomes shogun
1623: Iemitsu married Takaatsukasa Takako
1624: Tokugawa Masako gave birth to Empress Meishō
1625: Masako gave birth to Onna-ni-no-Miya
1626: Honda Tadatoki died, Senhime went back to Tokugawa Family with her daughter
1626: Died while Hidetada and Iemitsu were in Kyoto
1626: Received the posthumous court rank of Jūichi-i

Burial
After Hidetada resigned the government to his eldest son in 1623, Oeyo took a Buddhist name,   or Sogenin.  Her mausoleum can be found at Zōjō-ji in the Shiba neighborhood of Tokyo.

Honours
Junior First Rank (November 28, 1626; posthumous)

Taiga drama
NHK's 2011 Taiga drama, Gō: Himetachi no Sengoku, is based on the life of Oeyo who is played by the actress Juri Ueno.

Notable Descendants
Together with Odai no Kata (Ieyasu's mother) and Lady Saigo (mother of Hidetada), Oeyo was the matriarch who stabilized the Tokugawa shogunate. Her descendants became shoguns, aristocrats and other prominent political figures. It is speculated that her son, Iemitsu, was the last direct male descendant of Tokugawa Ieyasu, thus ending the patrilineality of the shogunate for the third generation.
 Toyotomi Sadako
 Matsudono Michiaki (1616–1646)
Nijō Yasumichi
Nijō Mitsuhira
Kujō Michifusa
 a daughter married Kujō Kaneharu
Kujō Sukezane
Kujō Morotaka
 Zuisho-in married Tokugawa Yoshimichi
Tokugawa Gorōta
Kujō Yukinori
Kujō Tanemoto
Kujō Naozane
Kujō Michisaki
Kujō Sukeie
Nijō Munemoto
 Nijō Shigeyori (1751–1768)
Nijō Harutaka
 Nijō Narimichi (1781–1798)
Kujō Suketsugu
 Saionji
 a daughter married Tokugawa Nariatsu
 a daughter married Matsudaira Yoritsugu of Hitachi-Fuchū Domain
Kujō Hisatada
Kujō Asako to Emperor Kōmei
 Imperial Princess Junko Naishinnō
 Imperial Princess Fuku
Michitaka
Matsuzono Hisayoshi
Tsurudono Tadayoshi
Takatsukasa Hiromichi
Nobusuke Takatsukasa
Toshimichi Takatsukasa
 Takatsukasa Nobuhiro (1892–1981)
Nijō Motohiro
Nijō Atsumoto
Nijō Narinobu
Nijō Nariyuki
Nijō Masamaro
 Nijō Toyomoto (1909–1944)
 Nijō Tamemoto (1911–1985)
 Nijō Suiko married Nabeshima Naotomo
Nabeshima Naotada
 Tokugawa Masako, married Emperor Go-Mizunoo
Empress Meishō
 Imperial Prince Takahito Shinno (1626–1628)
 Imperial Princess On'nani no Miya Naishinno (1625–1651)
 Wakamiya
 Kikumiya
 Imperial Princess Akiko no Miya Naishinno (1629–1675)
 Imperial Princess Noriko no Miya Naishinno (1632–1696)
 Katsuhime, married Matsudaira Tadanao
 Matsudaira Mitsunaga (1616–1707) of Takada Domain
 Matsudaira Tsunakata (1633–1674)
 Kamehime (1617–1681) married Takamatsu no Miya Yoshihito-Shinno, son of Emperor Go-Yōzei
 Tsuruhime (1618–1671) married Kujō Michifusa
 Third daughter married Asano Tsunaakira
 Fifth daughter married Asano Tsunaakira
 First daughter married Kujō Kaneharu
Kujō Sukezane
 Zuisho-in married Tokugawa Yoshimichi
Tokugawa Gorota
Kujō Morotaka
Kujō Yukinori
Kujō Tanemoto
Nijō Munemoto
 Nijō Shigeyori (1751–1768)
Nijō Harutaka
Kujō Hisatada
 Matsuzono Hisayoshi
 Tsurudono Tadayoshi
Takatsukasa Hiromichi
 Takatsukasa Nobuhiro
Nobusuke Takatsukasa
Toshimichi Takatsukasa
Nijō Motohiro
Nijō Atsumoto
Empress Eishō
 Imperial Princess Junko Nai-shinno
 Imperial Princess Fuko
Kujo Michitaka
Empress Teimei
Nobuhito, Prince Takamatsu
Yasuhito, Prince Chichibu
Takahito, Prince Mikasa
Prince Tomohito of Mikasa
Princess Yoko of Mikasa
Princess Akiko of Mikasa
Princess Yasuko of Mikasa
 Tadahiro Konoe (b. 1970)
Yoshihito, Prince Katsura
Norihito, Prince Takamado
Princess Tsuguko of Takamado
Princess Noriko of Takamado
Princess Ayako of Takamado
Princess Masako of Mikasa
 Akifumi Sen
 Makiko Sen
 Takafumi Sen
Hirohito, Emperor Showa
Akihito, Emperor of Japan
Sayako, Princess Nori
Fumihito, Prince Akishino
Princess Mako of Akishino
Princess Kako of Akishino
Prince Hisahito of Akishino
Naruhito, Emperor of Japan
Aiko, Princess Toshi
Takako, Princess Suga
 Yoshihisa Shimazu (b. 1962)
Masahito, Prince Hitachi
Atsuko, Princess Yori
Kazuko, Princess Taka
Sachiko, Princess Hisa
Shigeko, Princess Teru
 Mibu Motohiro (b. 1949)
 Princess Fumiko of Higashikuni (b. 1946)
 Princess Yuko of Higashikuni (b. 1954)
 Prince Naohiko Higashikuni
 Prince Teruhiko Higashikuni
 Prince Mutsuhiko Higashikuni
 Prince Nobuhiko Higashikuni (b. 1945)
 Prince Yukihiko Higashikuni (b. 1974)
 Nijō Narimichi (1781–1798)
 Sainjo
Kujō Suketsugu
 Nijō Suiko married Nabeshima Naotomo
Nabeshima Naotada
Nijō Narinobu
Nijō Nariyuki
Nijō Masamaro
 Nijo Toyomoto (1909–1944)
 Nijo Tamemoto (1911–1985)
Kujō Naozane
Kujō Michisaki
Kujō Sukeie

 Senhime – Daughter, married Toyotomi Hideyori and later married Honda Tadatoki
Kochiyo (1619–1621)
Katsuhime (1618–1678) married Ikeda Mitsumasa
 Tsuhime (1636–1717) married Ichijō Norisuke
Ichijō Kaneteru
Ikeda Tsunamasa
Ikeda Tsugumasa
Ikeda Munemasa
 Ikeda Harumasa (1750–1819)
 Ikeda Narimasa (1779–1833)
 Sagara Nagahiro (1752–1813)
 Sagara Yorinori (1774–1856)
 Sagara Yoriyuki (1798–1850)
 Ikeda Akimasa (1836–1903)
 Ikeda Narimasa (1865–1909)
 Ikeda Tadamasa (1895–1902)
 Ikeda Nobumasa (1904–1988)
 Ikeda Takamasa (1926–2012) married Atsuko Ikeda
  married Maeda Toshitsune
Maeda Toshitsugu
 Maeda Masatoshi (1649–1706)
 Manhime (1618–1700) married Asano Mitsuakira
 Asano Naganao (1644–1666)
 Asano Nagateru (1652–1702)
Asano Tsunaakira
Asano Tsunanaga
Asano Yoshinaga
Asano Munetsune
Asano Shigeakira
Asano Narikata
Asano Naritaka
Asano Yoshiteru
 Asano Nagatoshi
Asano Nagamichi
 Asano Toshitsugu
Asano Nagayuki
Asano Nagatake
Asano Nagayoshi
 Asano Nagataka (b. 1956)
 Asano Toshiteru
Asano Nagakoto
 Komatsuruhime (1613–1630) married Mōri Tadahiro
 Tomi-hime (1621–1662)
 Maeda Mitsutaka
 Maeda Tsunanori
 Maeda Toshiaki (1691–1737)
 Maeda Toshimichi (1737–1781)
 Maeda Toshitoyo (1771–1836)
 Maeda Toshihiro (1823–1877)
 Maeda Toshiaki (1850–1896)
 Toshinari Maeda
 Maeda Toshitatsu (1908–1989)
 Maeda Toshihiri (b. 1935)
 Maeda Toshitaka (b. 1963)
 Maeda Toshikyo (b. 1993)
 Maeda Yoshinori
 Maeda Munetoki
 Maeda Shigehiro
 Maeda Shigenobu
 Maeda Harunaga
 Maeda Shigemichi
 Maeda Narinaga
 Maeda Nariyasu
 Maeda Yoshiyasu
 Yoshitsugu Maeda (1858–1900)
 Tokugawa Iemitsu
Chiyohime- daughter married Tokugawa Mitsutomo
Tokugawa Tsunanari
Matsudaira Yoshitaka
Tokugawa Tsugutomo
 Matsuhime, married Maeda Yoshinori
Tokugawa Muneharu
Tokugawa Yoshimichi
Tokugawa Gorōta
 Shinjuin (1706–1757) married Kujō Yukinori
Kujō Tanemoto
Nijō Munemoto
 Nijō Shigeyoshi (1751–1768)
Nijō Harutaka
Nijō Suiko married Nabeshima Naotomo
Nabeshima Naotada
 Nijo Narimichi
 Saionji
Kujō Suketsugu
Nijō Narinobu
Nijō Nariyuki
Nijō Masamaro
Nijō Tamemoto (1911–1985)
Nijō Toyomoto (1909–1944)
Kujo Hisatada
Empress Eishō
 Imperial Princess Junko Naishinno
 Imperial Princess Fuko
Kujō Michitaka
Takatsukasa Hiromichi
Nobusuke Takatsukasa
Toshimichi Takatsukasa
 Takatsukasa Nobuhiro (1892–1981)
Nijō Motohiro
Nijō Atsumoto
 Tsurudono Tadayoshi
 Matsuzono Hisayoshi
Tokugawa Ietsuna
 Moyohime (1659–1660)
 Tokugawa Tsunayoshi (1659–1660)
Tokugawa Tsunayoshi
 Tokugawa Tokumatsu (1679–1683)
 Tokugawa Chomatsu (1683–1686)
 Tsuruhime (1677–1704)
Tokugawa Tsunashige
 Matsudaira Kiyotake (1663–1724)
 Matsudaira Kiyokata (1697-1724)
 Tokugawa Ienobu
 Tokugawa Ietsugu
 Tokugawa Daigoro (1709–1710)
 Tokugawa Iechiyo (1707–1707)
 Tokugawa Torakichi (1711–1712)
 Toyo-hime (1681–1681)
 Tokugawa Mugetsuin (1699–1699)

Notes

References
 Hickman, Money L., John T. Carpenter and Bruce A. Coats. (2002).  Japan's Golden Age: Momoyama. New Haven: Yale University Press. ; OCLC 34564921
 Wilson, Richard L. (1985).  Ogata Kenzan (1663–1743) (PhD thesis/dissertation). Lawrence, Kansas: University of Kansas.  OCLC 19111312

1573 births
1626 deaths
16th-century Japanese women
17th-century Japanese people
17th-century Japanese women
People of Azuchi–Momoyama-period Japan
People of Edo-period Japan
People of Muromachi-period Japan
People of Sengoku-period Japan
Azai clan
Tokugawa clan
Women of medieval Japan
16th-century Japanese people
Deified Japanese people